The 2008–09 Deutsche Eishockey Liga season was the 15th season since the founding of the Deutsche Eishockey Liga. 16 Teams played after the 2. Bundesliga Champion, the Kassel Huskies received the license to play in the DEL. After 52 rounds and the play-off's, the Eisbären Berlin won its 4th German Championship in the last five years.

Teams

In accordance to the cooperation contract between the DEL and the German Ice Hockey Federation, and after concluding that necessary reforms where not done in the 2. Bundesliga, a decision was made not to have playdowns and no teams were relegated. However, after ensuring compliance with the DEL regulations, the 2. Bundesliga Champions, the Kassel Huskies, were allowed to enter the league on July 4, 2008, expanding the league to 16 teams. This is also the first season where the Eisbären Berlin played in the brand new O2 World arena.

The number of regular seasons rounds was reduced to 52 from 56 in the previous season. The 6-best placed teams qualified for the playoffs, the teams in 7-10th position where to play a qualification round.

The average team budget was estimate at Euro € 5.24 million, raising the league total to Euro € 84.3 million from Euro € 78.7, mainly due to the addition of 1 team.

Regular season

GP = Games Played, W = Wins, OTW = Overtime win, SOW = Shootout win, OTL = Overtime loss, SOL = Shootout loss, L = Loss
Color code:  = Direct Playoff qualification,  = Playoff qualification round,  = No playoff

Playoffs

Playoff qualifications
The playoff qualifications were played between March 5 and 11, 2009 in the Best-of-five mode.

RS = Regular season; OT = Overtime

Playoff brackets

Quarterfinals
The quarterfinals were played in the Best-of-seven mode starting March 13 until March 26.

RS = Regular season; OT = Overtime

Semifinals
The semifinals were played in the Best-of-five mode, from March 29 to April 7, 2010.

RS = Regular season; OT = Overtime

Finale
The finals were played in the Best-of-five mode, from April 9, 2010.

RS = Regular season; OT = Overtime

The Eisbären Berlin won the title for the 4th time.

References

2008–09 in European ice hockey leagues
2008-09
2008–09 in German ice hockey